Prairie Public is a network of ten North Dakota radio stations. It is a service of Prairie Public Broadcasting, in association with North Dakota State University in Fargo.

Prairie Public maintains active studios in Grand Forks, Fargo, and Bismarck. It provides National Public Radio (NPR) news and programming, local and regional news, and two distinct music formats: the News and Classical network, and the adult album alternative formatted Roots, Rock, and Jazz network.

Programming

Prairie Public produces and broadcasts Main Street, a weekday interview show hosted by Ashley Thornberg and Alicia Hegland-Thorpe, Dakota Datebook, Into the Music with Mike Olson, Prebys on Classics, and Why?, hosted by UND philosophy professor Dr. Jack Weinstein. Prairie Public is also the distributor for The Thomas Jefferson Hour.

Prairie Public offers news programming on weekday mornings and afternoons from its newsrooms in Bismarck and Fargo. It also airs news from NPR.

Prairie Public is a member station of National Public Radio, airing programs such as All Things Considered, and also carries programming from Public Radio International (such as The World) and American Public Media, as well as from Public Radio Exchange (such as This American Life).

Prairie Public's radio network offers two programming services. The primary News and Classical network originating from KCND in Bismarck is carried on most stations, and split into eastern and western schedules. The adult album alternative formatted Roots, Rock, and Jazz network originating from KFJM in Grand Forks has gradually expanded its programming to additional stations since its launch in 2002. KDSU in Fargo carries a combination of both networks, airing Roots, Rock and Jazz programming when the rest of the main network airs classical music.

News and Classical network

The primary network of Prairie Public airs classical music, news, talk, and weekend specialty shows, including jazz.

Roots, Rock, and Jazz network
KFJM originates Prairie Public's second music format, a mixture of adult album alternative, blues, folk, and jazz. The network is rebroadcast full-time on KPPR Williston and the HD-2 channel of Prairie Public's other full-power News and Classical stations. KDSU of Fargo broadcasts the network midday weekdays and overnights.

Stations
Prairie Public has 10 full power stations and 5 low-power translators broadcasting across North Dakota, northwest Minnesota, and eastern Montana.

HD Radio
Prairie Public's full power stations broadcast HD Radio signals, adding full-digital simulcasts of their analog channel, plus the Roots, Rock, and Jazz network on subchannel "HD-2" of the News and Classical stations.

Cable systems
Shaw Cable's Winnipeg system carried Prairie Public's News and Classical service at 107.9 FM (via KUND-FM), until Shaw discontinued FM distribution in 2012.

Prairie Public's News and Classical network is carried on MTS Ultimate TV across Manitoba, on channel 733.

History
Prairie Public was established on February 1, 1999 as the North Dakota Public Radio network. It consisted of three partners — Prairie Public Broadcasting, the North Dakota State University, and the University of North Dakota — with the goal of providing a full public radio service to all of North Dakota.

At the time of North Dakota Public Radio's formation, the University of North Dakota operated three stations in Grand Forks: KUND (AM), KUND-FM (89.3 FM) which dated to 1976, and KFJM (90.7 FM) which started in 1995. KUND (AM) had been established, as KFJM, in 1923 as one of the first college radio stations in the United States. It left the network after it was sold in 2004. North Dakota State University's station, KDSU (91.9 FM) in Fargo dated to 1966. These stations were early members of NPR, but this left western North Dakota without public radio. Prairie Public Television had broadened its mission to include radio in the late 1970s, and in 1981 KCND in Bismarck signed on as the first public radio station in the western part of the state, under the on-air name of Prairie Public Radio. Between 1981 and 1993, four more stations signed on.

On September 26, 2006, North Dakota Public Radio was renamed Prairie Public, chosen to achieve brand consistency with Prairie Public Broadcasting's television and other operations.

In 2009, KPPD signed on as a full-power station for the Devils Lake region, and HD Radio was rolled out to all Prairie Public full-power stations. In 2012, KPPW signed on as the new full-power News and Classical network station for Williston, with KPPR moving to the Roots, Rock, and Jazz network.

In September 2018, KFJM and KUND-FM were sold by the University of North Dakota to Prairie Public Broadcasting.

See also
Prairie Public Television

References

External links
Listen live: News and Classical | Roots, Rock, and Jazz | KDSU
Prairie Public radio website
Roots, Rock, and Jazz network website

HD Radio stations
 
Radio stations in Minnesota
 

American radio networks
NPR member networks